The Dangerous World Tour was the second world concert tour by American singer Michael Jackson to promote his eighth studio album Dangerous. The tour was sponsored by Pepsi-Cola. All profits were donated to various charities including Jackson's own "Heal the World Foundation". It began in Munich, Germany, on June 27, 1992, and concluded in Mexico City, Mexico, on November 11, 1993, playing 69 concerts in Europe, Asia and Latin America. Jackson performed in stadiums across the world with all being sold out in countries in Asia, Latin America, and Europe. At the tour's end, it grossed over $100 million and was attended by 3,111,000 people.

The October 1, 1992, concert in Bucharest, Romania was filmed for broadcast on the HBO network on October 10. Jackson sold the film rights for the concert for $20 million, then the highest amount for a concert performer to appear on television. The special, Live in Bucharest: The Dangerous Tour, earned Jackson the second of two CableACE Awards of his career, this one for Outstanding Performance Musical Special.

Background 

In January 1989, Jackson finished his Bad tour, his first as a solo artist, which had grossed over $125 million. Initially he planned not to tour again and concentrate on making albums and films. Following the release of his eighth studio album Dangerous in November 1991, a press conference was held on February 3, 1992 at Radio City Music Hall in New York City to announce the Dangerous Tour. The event, attended by 200 people, was organized by Jackson's sponsor Pepsi with the artist also present. Jackson explained his sole reason for touring once more was to raise funds for his newly-formed Heal the World Foundation to aid children and the environment. He aimed to raise $100 million for the charity by Christmas 1993. It was revealed that Jackson planned to perform across Europe, Asia, Latin America, and Australia, with no dates in the United States or Canada. Jackson commented: "I am looking forward to this tour because it will allow me to devote time to visiting children all around the world, as well as spread the message of global love, in the hope that others will be moved to do their share to help heal the world".

Development 
In June 1992, a Russian Antonov AN-124 cargo jet, then the world's largest operating airplane, was booked to transport the equipment and stage set from Los Angeles to London for the opening European leg. However, problems regarding its civilian aircraft certification led to Jackson using a Federal Express Boeing 747 instead. Upon arrival, the equipment was transported across Europe by 65 lorries. The cargo included 1,000 lights, 10 miles of electrical cable, 9 video screens, and 168 speakers. Around 2 tons of clothing was transported. The outfits were designed by Michael Bush and Dennis Tompkins, who worked with Jackson to gain an idea on what he wanted, and aimed to "bring his ideas to life". Two outfits were 9 feet tall, 7 feet wide, and weighed 40 lbs each, with fibre optic lights controlled by a computerised laser. One jacket was fitted with a battery belt generating 3,000 volts to light the 36 strobe lights on it. Another had hidden flaps to conceal explosive effects. 1,000 yards of fabric from Europe was used to make the costumes, including a black and gold outfit for Jackson which included 18-karat gold. The costumes alone cost $2 million.

The show incorporated various stage illusions. Among them was the "toaster" effect where Jackson entered the stage on a rapidly rising catapult from underneath, sending off pyrotechnics at the same time. His sister Janet Jackson said: "That opening was kick-ass. I'm sitting in the sound tower and all the kids are everywhere. And when he jumped out of whatever the hell that thing was [...] the kids in front of me were looking back and I didn't even know it". Most of the 1992 shows included a stage trick during the transition from "Thriller" to "Billie Jean", whereby Jackson walks into two pillars and is secretly switched with a werewolf-masked backup dancer disguised as himself while he changes outfits for "Billie Jean". The masked "Jackson" is placed into a coffin which disappears when dancers posing as the skeletons and zombies drape a cloth over the coffin and pull it out. Jackson then appears on an upper stage level and sings "Billie Jean". When the full trick was not performed, it featured a sequence with the Jackson impersonator and the backup dancers performing dances from "Thriller". In some concerts, the Jackson impersonator would go back stage after singing the main chorus of the song, instead of doing a reprise of the "Thriller" dance, and the Zombie backup-dancers would do a reprise of the dance by themselves. Another such illusion was used to transition to "Beat It" from "Working Day And Night".

This was the first tour to have Jackson doing 'the lean' during Smooth Criminal; the song was part of his Bad Tour set list, but its choreography did not match the music video.

Overview

Europe and Asia (1992)
During the Europe leg in 1992, MTV was allowed to film backstage and broadcast six fifteen-minute episodes of the tour. The show was called The Dangerous Diaries and was presented by Sonya Saul. MTV released footage of "Billie Jean" and "Black Or White" at the first show in Munich. "Billie Jean" was released with two different versions, one by MTV as a special, and the other on the Dangerous Diaries documentary. Both versions have placed a snippet of Jackson's original a cappella recording for "Billie Jean" over the live vocals when Jackson throws his fedora.
During the Cardiff concert performed on August 5, 1992, the show was temporarily halted between "She's Out of My Life" and the "Jackson 5 Medley" due to heavy rain, with a message being sent out over the speakers. Jackson also had to stand on a towel to keep balance during "I Just Can't Stop Loving You." The Toulouse, France concert performed on September 16, 1992, featured a special instrumental performance of the first half of the song "In the Closet" as an interlude between the songs "Heal the World" and "Man in the Mirror". Princess Stéphanie of Monaco, who was the "Mystery Girl" in the actual song, was in attendance at this concert. This concert marked the first and only time that this song was performed during this tour, although it was performed on his next tour.

Super Bowl halftime show (1993)
Between the two legs of the tour, Jackson performed a brief but very widely seen and highly acclaimed concert at the Super Bowl XXVII halftime show on January 31, 1993. The National Football League donated $100,000 to the Heal the World Foundation in lieu of payment to Jackson.

Eurasia and Latin America (1993)
The 1993 leg of the tour started in Bangkok, Thailand on August 24, the same day that accusations against Jackson of sexual abuse were made public. The September 1, 1993, concert in Singapore was scheduled for August 30, 1993, but was rescheduled due to Jackson collapsing before the show. During his visit to Moscow in September, Jackson came up with the song "Stranger in Moscow" which would be released on his 1995 album HIStory: Past, Present and Future, Book I It was during a time when Jackson felt very alone, far away from his family and friends, yet every night throughout his tours fans would stay by his hotel and support him.

Set lists 
{{hidden
| headercss = background: #ccccff; font-size: 100%; width: 100%;
| contentcss = text-align: left; font-size: 100%; width: 100%;
| header = 1992
| content =
"Brace Yourself" (Video Introduction) (contains elements of "Carmina Burana: I. O Fortuna” and "Great Gates Of Kiev") 
"Jam"
"Wanna Be Startin' Somethin'"
"Human Nature"
"Smooth Criminal"
"I Just Can't Stop Loving You" (with Siedah Garrett)
"She's Out of My Life"
"I Want You Back" / "The Love You Save" / "I'll Be There"
"Thriller"
"Billie Jean"
"Black Or White Panther" (Video Interlude)
"Working Day and Night"
"Beat It"
"Someone Put Your Hand Out" (Instrumental Interlude)
"Will You Be There"
"The Way You Make Me Feel"
"Bad"
"Black or White"
"We Are The World" (Video Interlude)
"Heal the World"
"Man in the Mirror" / "Rocket Man"

}}
{{hidden
| headercss = background: #ccccff; font-size: 100%; width: 100%;
| contentcss = text-align: left; font-size: 100%; width: 100%;
| header = 1993
| content = 
"Brace Yourself" (Video Introduction) (contains elements of "Carmina Burana: I. O Fortuna”) 
"Jam"
"Wanna Be Startin' Somethin'"
"Human Nature"
"Smooth Criminal"
"I Just Can't Stop Loving You" (with Siedah Garrett)
"She's Out of My Life"
"I Want You Back" / "The Love You Save" / "I'll Be There"
"Thriller"
"Billie Jean"
"Black Or White Panther" (Video Interlude)
"Will You Be There"
"Dangerous"
"Black or White"
Encore
"We Are The World" (Video Interlude)
"Heal the World"
}}

Broadcasts and recordings 

All concerts were professionally filmed by Nocturne Productions Inc., which filmed all of Jackson's tours and private affairs. During the 1992 European leg of the tour, MTV was given permission to film backstage reports, interview the cast and film live performance. The mini-show was hosted by Sonya Saul and had six, 15-minute mini-episodes of concerts in Munich, Werchter, Dublin, Stockholm, Hamburg, Cardiff, London, Leeds, Berlin, Oviedo, and Madrid. Performances include "Billie Jean", "Black or White", "Jam", "Wanna Be Startin' Somethin'", and "Will You Be There". The concert in Bucharest on October 1, 1992, was filmed and broadcast on television all across the world, giving HBO the highest rating garnered in cable TV History, with an alternate version airing on the BBC. The concert film titled Live in Bucharest: The Dangerous Tour was officially released on DVD on July 25, 2005. Full concerts at Oslo (July 15, 1992) and Copenhagen (July 20th, 1992) were fundraised for online by the fans & purchased from private owners of those respective concerts, and performances at Bremen (August 8, 1992), Buenos Aires (October 12th, 1993) and several scattered amateur recordings have been shared online and can be found on YouTube.

Opening acts 
 Kris Kross 
 Rozalla 
 TLC 
 D'Influence 
 Snap! 
 Culture Beat

Tour dates

Cancelled shows

Known preparation dates

Personnel 
Dangerous World Tour

Lead Performer
Lead vocals, dance and choreographer: Michael Jackson

Dancers
 LaVelle Smith (choreographer)
 Dominic Lucero (asst. choreographer; 1992 leg)
 Jamie King (1992 and 1993 legs)
 Eddie Garcia (1992 leg)
 Randy Allaire (1992 leg)
 Travis Payne (1993 leg)
 Jason Yribar (1993 leg)
 Bruno "Taco" Falcon (asst. choreographer; 1992 and 1993 legs)
 Michelle Berube
 Yuko Sumida
 Damon Navandi

Musicians
 Musical director: Greg Phillinganes (1992), Brad Buxer (1993)
 Assistant musical director: Kevin Dorsey
 Keyboards/Synthesizers: Greg Phillinganes (1992); Brad Buxer, Isaiah Sanders (1993)
 Drums: Ricky Lawson
 Lead/rhythm guitar: Jennifer Batten (1992), Becky Barksdale (1993), David Williams
 Bass guitar/Synth bass: Don Boyette
Vocalists
 Vocal director: Kevin Dorsey
 Background vocals: Darryl Phinnessee, Dorian Holley, Siedah GarrettKevin Dorsey
Guests
 Slash – Lead guitar on Black or White in Oviedo (September 21, 1992) and Tokyo (December 30 and 31, 1992)

Musical 

MJ the Musical is a jukebox musical that premiered on Broadway in February 2022. "The show takes audiences behind the scenes as Michael prepares for the 1992 Dangerous Tour, providing an in-depth look at his process. As Michael and his collaborators rehearse their epic setlist, we are transported to pivotal creative moments from his career." The show is set to feature over 25 of Michael Jackson's biggest hits.

References 

Notes

Citations

Sources
George, Nelson (2004). Michael Jackson: The Ultimate Collection booklet. Sony BMG.

Michael Jackson concert tours
1992 concert tours
1993 concert tours